The following is a timeline of the history of the city of Portland, Maine, USA.

Prior to 19th century
 1633 - Casco settled.
 1658 - Settlement renamed "Falmouth." 
 1668 - Eastern Cemetery established.
 1676 - Village sacked by the Wampanoag during King Philip's War.
 1690 - Battle of Fort Loyal.
 1718 - Town of Falmouth established.
 1740 - First Parish Church built.
 1763 - Falmouth Library Society organized.
 1764 - Population: about 2,000.  

 1775
 Thompson's War
 Town burned by British.
 1768 - Portland Fire Department formed, March 29.
 1785 - Falmouth Gazette newspaper begins publication.
 1785/6 - Wadsworth-Longfellow House built.
 1786 - Falmouth renamed "Portland."
 1790
 Gazette of Maine newspaper begins publication.
 Population: 2,240.
 Lighthouse built.
 1796 - Portland Marine Society incorporated.

19th century

 1800 - Population: 3,704.
 1803 - Eastern Argus newspaper begins publication.
 1805 - Portland Benevolent Society incorporated.
 1806 - Gorham Academy built.
 1807
 Portland Observatory built.
 Birth of Henry Wadsworth Longfellow.
 1819 - State constitutional convention held.
 1820
 Portland becomes capital of State of Maine.
 Maine Council of Royal Masters instituted.
 Population: 8,581.
 1821
 High School established.
 Maine Mineralogical Society established.  
 Maine Encampment of Knight Templars established.
 1822 - Maine Historical Society founded.
 1825 - First Parish Church built.
 1826 - Portland Athenaeum founded.
 1827 - John Neal opened the first public gymnasium in the US founded by an American in town hall in Market Square
 1828
Maine's first literary periodical, The Yankee, founded.
 Abyssinian Meeting House established.
 Mariner's Church built.
 1829
 Theatre built on Union Street.
 Western Cemetery established.
 1830 - Population - 12,598.
 1831 - Westbrook Seminary chartered.
 1832
 State capital moves from Portland to Augusta.
 City of Portland chartered.
 Cumberland and Oxford Canal opened bringing interior trade to Portland harbor from Long Lake
 1836 - Western Promenade laid out.
 1839 - B. Thurston & Co. publishers established.
 1843
 Railway service began between Boston and Portland.
 Portland Society of Natural History organized.
 1844 - Portland Steam Packet Company organized.
1845 - The Pleasure Boat newspaper begins publication.
 1846 - Portland Company established to build railway locomotives.
 1849 - Portland Gas Light Co. incorporated.
 1850
 Curtis' chewing gum manufactory in business.
 Population: 20,815.
 1851 - Kennebec and Portland Rail Road begins operating.
 1853
 Grand Trunk Railway to Montreal begins operating.
 Portland Board of Trade established.
 Roman Catholic Diocese of Portland established.
 1855
 Portland Rum Riot.
 Evergreen Cemetery established.
 United States Marine Hospital established. 
 1856 - Chestnut Street Methodist Church built.
 1859 - Forest City Cemetery established.
 1862
 Portland Daily Press newspaper begins publication.
 Maine Central Railroad Company begins operations.
 1863
 Battle of Portland Harbor.
 Portland street car service began.
 Galt wharf grain elevator completed for export of Canadian wheat.

 1866 - Fire.
 1867
 Portland Institute and Public Library founded.
 First Baptist Church built.
 Water company established to supply the city from Sebago Lake. 
 1868 - U.S. Customhouse and St. Paul's Church and Rectory built.
 1869 - Cathedral of the Immaculate Conception construction completed. 
 1870 - Cumberland and Oxford Canal abandoned when Portland and Ogdensburg Railroad reached Sebago Lake.
 1875 - Southworth Press established.
 1881 - Young People's Society of Christian Endeavour founded by Francis Edward Clark.
 1882
 Portland Society of Art founded.
 Evening Express newspaper begins publication.
 1884 - Maine Genealogical Society organized.
 1886 - Portland centennial.
 1888 - Henry Wadsworth Longfellow Monument unveiled at Longfellow Square in West End.
 1890 - Population: 36,425.
 1891 - Portland Soldiers and Sailors Monument dedicated on Monument Square.
 1897
 Jefferson Theatre opens.
 Maine Music Festival begins.
 St. Lawrence Church and Williston-West Church built.
 1898 - Waynflete School established.
 1899
 Deering becomes part of Portland.
 Portland Camera Club formed.
 1900 - Population: 50,145.

20th century
 1901 - New England Elevator Company built the largest grain elevator on the Atlantic coast.
 1906 - Portland Company ceased building railway locomotives.
 1908 - Portland Society of Arts and Crafts organized.
 1909 - City Hall re-built. 
 1910
 Memorial statue of Thomas Brackett Reed unveiled.
 Population: 58,571.
 1911
 L. D. M. Sweat Memorial Art Museum dedicated.
 Portland Terminal Company formed.
 1912
 Kotzschmar Memorial Organ installed in City Hall's Merrill Auditorium.
 Eastern Promenade laid out according to design by Olmsted Brothers.
 1913
 State of Maine Express began direct Pullman railway service from major US cities to Portland.
 Historical pageant takes place on Eastern Promenade.
 1914
 Portland–Lewiston Interurban service began between Portland and Lewiston.
 Portland Exposition Building and Green Memorial A.M.E. Zion Church built.
 1916 - Million Dollar Bridge opens.
 1918 - Queen's Hospital for women opens.
 1919 - Portland designated eastern end of the Theodore Roosevelt International Highway.
 1921 - Etz Chaim Synagogue built.
 1923
 Portland Symphony Orchestra and Children's Theatre of Portland established.
 Canadian National Railway began diverting export traffic from Portland to Canadian Maritime ports.
 1924
 Maine State Pier and Chapman Building constructed.
 Longfellow Garden Club organized.
 1926 - U.S. Route 1 linked Portland to the United States highway system.
 1928 - James E. Barlow hired as second City Manager
 1929 - State Theatre opens.
 1930 - The Gull began international Pullman train service through Portland from the Maritimes.
 1933
Portland-Westbrook Municipal Airport established.
End of interurban service from Portland to surrounding communities.
 1934 - Flying Yankee began streamliner service to Portland.
 1940 - East Wind began summer passenger train service to Portland for vacationers from major eastern cities.
 1941
 Portland–Montreal Pipe Line completed.
 Portland became United States Navy destroyer base Sail during the Battle of the Atlantic.
 Victoria Mansion museum opens.
 Portland street car system dismantled.
 1942 - Battery Steele built.
 1944 - A-26 Invader crash near Portland airport was Maine's worst aircraft accident.
 1946 - Baxter Woods municipal forest established.
 1947 - Maine Turnpike connected Portland to what would become the Interstate Highway System.
 1950 - Population: 77,634.
 1953 - WCSH begins broadcasting.
 1954 - WMTW begins broadcasting.
 1960 - Tukey's Bridge built.
 1961 - Demolition of Union Station ended daily passenger train service to Portland.
 1964 - Greater Portland Landmarks preservation group formed.
 1965 - Kennedy Park housing built.
 1967 - Summer weekend passenger train service to Portland ended.
 1970 - University of Southern Maine Portland campus established.
 1973
 Old Port Festival begins.
 WMPG begins broadcasting.
 Salt Institute for Documentary Studies founded.
 1974 - The Hollow Reed restaurant in the Old Port is founded.
1976 - Children's Museum of Maine founded.
 1977 - Cumberland County Civic Center built.
 1978 - Portland Stage Company active.
 1984
 Sister city relationship established with Shinagawa, Tokyo, Japan.
 Portland Ice Arena opens.
 1985 - Portland Monthly magazine begins publication.
 1993
 Portland Pirates ice hockey team formed.
 Maine Narrow Gauge Railroad Museum opens.
 1994
 Portland Chamber Music Festival begins.
 PORTopera founded.
 Hadlock Field opens.
 1997
 Casco Bay Bridge opens.
 City website online (approximate date).

21st century

 2001 - Downeaster restores passenger train service to Portland.
 2003 - Sister city relationship established with Mytilene, Greece.
 2006 - Maine Roller Derby and Portland Society of Architects founded.
 2007 - Green Elephant Vegetarian Bistro is founded in the Arts District.
2007 - Whole Foods grocery in business.
 2008 - Maine Mead Works in business.
 2009
 Port City Music Hall opens.
 Congress Street designated an historic district.
 2010
 State Theatre reopens.
 Trader Joe's grocery in business.
 Population: 66,194 city; 514,098 metro.

See also
 History of Portland, Maine
 Neighborhoods in Portland, Maine
 List of mayors of Portland, Maine
 National Register of Historic Places listings in Portland, Maine
 Railroad history of Portland, Maine
 List of Portland, Maine schools

References

Bibliography

Published in the 19th century
 
 
 
 
 
 
 
 William Willis. The history of Portland, from 1632 to 1864, 2nd ed. Portland: Bailey & Noyes, 1865
 
 
 
 
 
 
 
 
 
 
 

Published in the 20th century

External links

 Historic images related to Portland (via Maine Memory Network)
 
 
 Works related to Portland, various dates (via Digital Public Library of America).

 
Portland
Portland
Portland